Isonychia is a genus of brushlegged mayflies in the family Isonychiidae, the sole genus of the family. There are more than 30 described species in Isonychia.

Species
These 36 species belong to the genus Isonychia:

 Isonychia arabica Al-Zubaidi, Braasch & Al-Kayatt, 1987
 Isonychia arida (Say, 1839)
 Isonychia berneri Kondratieff & Voshell, 1984
 Isonychia bicolor (Walker, 1853) (mahogany dun)
 Isonychia campestris McDunnough, 1931
 Isonychia crassiuscula Tiunova, Kluge & Ishiwata, 2004
 Isonychia diversa Traver, 1934
 Isonychia formosana (Ulmer, 1912)
 Isonychia formosus Ulmer, 1912
 Isonychia georgiae McDunnough, 1931
 Isonychia grandis (Ulmer, 1913)
 Isonychia guixiensis Wu & Gui, 1992
 Isonychia hoffmani Kondratieff & Voshell, 1984
 Isonychia ignota (Walker, 1853)
 Isonychia intermedia (Eaton, 1885)
 Isonychia japonica (Ulmer, 1920)
 Isonychia khyberensis (Ali, 1970)
 Isonychia kiangsinensis Hsu, 1936
 Isonychia obscura Traver, 1932
 Isonychia rufa McDunnough, 1931
 Isonychia sayi Burks, 1953
 Isonychia serrata Traver, 1932
 Isonychia sexpetala Tiunova, Kluge & Ishiwata, 2004
 Isonychia shima (Matsumura, 1931)
 Isonychia sibirica Tiunova, Kluge & Ishiwata, 2004
 Isonychia sicca (Walsh, 1862)
 Isonychia similis Traver, 1932
 Isonychia sinensis Wu & Gui, 1992
 Isonychia sumatranus (Navás, 1933)
 Isonychia tusculanensis Berner, 1948
 Isonychia unicolorata Tiunova, Kluge & Ishiwata, 2004
 Isonychia ussurica Bajkova, 1970
 Isonychia velma Needham, 1932
 Isonychia vshivkovae Tiunova, Kluge & Ishiwata, 2004
 Isonychia winkleri Ulmer, 1939
 † Isonychia alderensis Lewis, 1977

References

Further reading

External links

 

Mayflies
Articles created by Qbugbot